Fanad United Football Club is an Irish association football club based in Fanad in the north of County Donegal. Their senior men's team currently plays in the Donegal Junior League. In 1986–87 they were both founding members and inaugural champions of the Ulster Senior League. They remain the USL's most successful club, having won fourteen titles. They also field teams in both the Donegal Youth League and the Donegal Women's League. They have previously fielded teams in both the A Championship and the League of Ireland U19 Division. They have also played in the FAI Cup, the League of Ireland Cup and the FAI Intermediate Cup. They have won the latter competition on two occasions, in 1987–88 and 1994–95. In September 2020 the club made the decision to Leave the USL and Intermediate Football and return to Junior Football in the Donegal League.

History

Early years
Fanad United was founded in 1970 by Fr. Michael Sweeney, a pioneer of junior and intermediate association football in County Donegal. In addition to founding Fanad United, Fr Sweeney was also instrumental in establishing two leagues the club initially played in, the Donegal League and the Ulster Senior League. He has also served on the board of Finn Harps. Between 1972 and 1973 and 1983–84, Fanad United were Donegal champions five times before becoming both founding members and the inaugural champions of the USL in 1986–87. They subsequently became the USL's most successful club, winning fourteen league titles and ten league cups.

National cups
Fr. Michael Sweeney also served as Fanad United's team manager and he was responsible for guiding the club to victory in two national cup competitions. In 1978–79 United won the FAI Youth Cup after defeating Shelbourne U19 3–1 in the final at Swilly Park. In 1987–88 they won the FAI Intermediate Cup after defeating Tramore Athletic 1–0 at Dalymount Park. Under player-manager Eamon McConigley, Fanad United won the FAI Intermediate Cup for a second time in 1994–95, this time defeating College Corinthians in the final at Terryland Park. In 1995–96 they were finalists for a second successive season but lost to Wayside Celtic.

As winners of the Ulster Senior League, Fanad United have regularly been invited to participate in the League of Ireland Cup. Their best performance in this competition came in 1987–88 when they reached the semi-finals. After they finished top of their group, following three wins against Sligo Rovers, Derry City and Finn Harps, they qualified for the quarter-finals where they defeated Galway United 1–0. In the semi-final they lost 4–1 to Shamrock Rovers. Fanad United have also achieved some notable results in the FAI Cup. In 1991–92, despite going down to nine men, they defeated Home Farm 2–0 away from home in the first round. In the second round they held St James's Gate to two 1–1 draws before eventually losing 3–2 in the second replay. In 1995–96 they defeated Bray Wanderers 4–0 at the Carlisle Grounds before losing 3–0 to St Patrick's Athletic in the round of sixteen. In the 2005 FAI Cup they played Shamrock Rovers at Dalymount Park losing 2–0.

National leagues
In 2011 Fanad United entered a team in the A Championship. They subsequently finished fourth in their group of eight. When the A Championship was disbanded Fanad United joined the League of Ireland U19 Division.

Buncrana tragedy
In March 2016, Fanad United player Davitt Walsh came to national attention when he rescued a baby, Rioghnach-Ann McGrotty, following a tragic incident in Buncrana. Walsh risked his life while saving Rioghnach-Ann from drowning after the family car she was in accidentally slipped off the pier. Her two brothers, father, aunt and grandmother all lost their lives in the accident. Walsh's bravery was recognised by the Irish Government and he was awarded a gallantry medal by Shane Ross, the Minister for Transport, Tourism and Sport.

Ground
Fanad United play their home games at Traigh-a-Loch, located between Lough Swilly and Mulroy Bay.

Managers
  Fr. Michael Sweeney
  James Doherty 
  Eamon McConigley
  Ollie Horgan
  Michael Deeney 
  Arthur Lynch

Honours
Ulster Senior League
Winners: 1986–87, 1987–88, 1989–90, 1990–91, 1992–93, 1993–94, 1994–95, 1995–96, 1996–97, 1997–98, 2000–01, 2005–06, 2006–07, 2011: 14
Ulster Senior League League Cup
Winners: 1988–89, 1990–91, 1992–93, 1994–95, 1995–96, 2004–05, 2005–06, 2007, 2008, 2011: 10
Runners-up: 1987–88, 1998–99, 1999–2000, 2002–03, 2006–07, 2009 : 6
FAI Intermediate Cup
Winners: 1987–88, 1994–95: 2
Runners-up: 1995–96: 1
FAI Youth Cup
Winners: 1978–79: 1
Donegal League
Winners: 1972–73, 1973–74, 1974–75, 1979–80, 1983–84: 5

References

External links
  Fanad United on Facebook
  Fanad United on Twitter

 
1972 establishments in Ireland
A Championship teams
Association football clubs established in 1972
Association football clubs in County Donegal
Ulster Senior League (association football) teams